Callisburg High School is a high school located in Callisburg, Texas (USA) and classified as a 3A school by the UIL. It is part of the Callisburg Independent School District located in Cooke County. In 2015, the school was rated "Met Standard" by the Texas Education Agency.

Athletics
The Callisburg Wildcats compete in these sports - 

Baseball
Basketball
Cross Country
Football
Golf
Powerlifting
Softball
Tennis
Track and Field
Volleyball
 State Champions 2018 (3A)

References

External links
Official Website

Education in Cooke County, Texas
Public high schools in Texas